The 2012 College Basketball Invitational (CBI) was a single-elimination tournament of 16 NCAA Division I teams that did not participate in the 2012 NCAA Tournament or the 2012 National Invitation Tournament. The opening games began on Tuesday, March 13. A best-of-three championship series between the final two teams was held on March 26, March 28, and March 30. HDNet covered select games from the first and second rounds as well as the semifinals and the championship games for the fourth consecutive year. The tournament was won by Pittsburgh who defeated Washington State 2–1 in the finals series.

Participants

Bracket

Home teams are listed second.

References

College Basketball Invitational
College Basketball Invitational